Ched Myers is an American theologian specializing in biblical studies and political theology.

Career
Since the late 1970s, Myers has been involved in numerous issues including movement work for racial justice, economic equity, indigenous sovereignty, anti-nuclear activism and ecological justice and restoration. He has traveled as an "old-school" itinerant teacher for over twenty years teaching in homes, churches, retreat centers and more.

In 1988, Myers published Binding the Strong ManA Political Reading of Mark's Story of Jesus, which was influential in the Radical Discipleship Movement, particularly within the Catholic Worker Movement.  The book was one of the earliest commentaries to take an empire-critical view, a view that was marginal in the 1980s, but is now widely accepted within the academy.  Throughout the late 1990s and early 2000s, Myers devoted much of his teaching to what he calls Sabbath economics.

He works alongside his wife, Elaine Enns, as part of Bartimaeus Cooperative Ministries, where the emphasis is on education for restorative justice, biblical literacy, ecological discipleship and radical economic sharing.

Selected works

Single-author books 
2008/1988  Binding the Strong Man: A Political Reading of Mark’s Story of Jesus. Maryknoll: Orbis Books. 20th anniversary edition with new front matter. 1989 Catholic Press Association Book Award in scripture. Translated into Portuguese as O Evangelho de Sao Marcos, Grande Comentario Biblico series, São Paulo:Edicoes Paulinas, 1992. 

2001  “…and distributed it to whoever had need.” The Biblical Vision of Sabbath Economics.  Tell the Word, Washington, DC: Church of the Savior.

1996  Proclamation 6, Year B, Pentecost 1. Minneapolis: Augsburg/Fortress.

1994  Who Will Roll Away the Stone? Queries for First World Christians. Maryknoll: Orbis Books.

Co-authored books 
2012  Our God Is Undocumented: Biblical Faith and Immigrant Justice.  With Matthew Colwell.  Maryknoll: Orbis Books.

2011  Liberating Biblical Study: Scholarship, Art and Action in Honor of the Center and Library for the Bible and Social Justice.  With Laurel Dykstra.  Eugene, OR: Cascade Books.

2009  Ambassadors of Reconciliation, Vol. I: New Testament Reflections on Restorative Justice and Peacemaking.  With Elaine Enns.  Maryknoll: Orbis Books. 
Ambassadors of Reconciliation, Vol. II: Diverse Christian Practices of Restorative Justice and Peacemaking.  With Elaine Enns.  Maryknoll: Orbis Books.

1996 “Say to This Mountain”: Mark’s Story of Discipleship. With Stuart Taylor, Cindy Moe-Lobeda, Joseph Nangle, OFM and Marie Dennis. Maryknoll: Orbis Books.

1991  The American Journey, 1492-1992: A Call to Conversion. With Stuart Taylor, Cindy Moe-Lobeda, and Marie Dennis. Erie, PA: Pax Christi Press.

1990  Resisting the Serpent: Palau’s Struggle for Self-Determination. With Robert Aldridge. Baltimore: Fortkamp Press.

See also

 List of theologians
 Lists of American writers

External links
 chedmyers.org, his official website
 
 bcm-net.org, official website of Bartimaeus Cooperative Ministries

Year of birth missing (living people)
Place of birth missing (living people)
20th-century American writers
21st-century American writers
Living people
American theologians
Christian radicals
American Christians